Edifici Colón (also Torre Maritima) is an office skyscraper in Barcelona, Catalonia, Spain. It is located in the district of Ciutat Vella, Avinguda de les Drassanes. Built in 1970, it was the first skyscraper above 100 metres built in Barcelona.

See also 

 List of tallest buildings and structures in Barcelona

External links 
Official page of Edificio Colón

References 

Skyscraper office buildings in Barcelona

Office buildings completed in 1970